Zavodske settlement hromada is a territorial community in Ukraine, in Chortkiv Raion of Ternopil Oblast. The administrative center is the urban-type settlement of Zavodske. Population:

History
It was formed on August 11, 2015 by merging Zavodske Village Council and Uhryn Village Council of Chortkiv Raion.

On November 27, 2020, Zalisyanska, Shvaykivska, Shmankivska and Shmankivchytska village councils of Chortkiv Raion became part of the community.

Settlements
The community consists of 1 urban-type settlement (Zavodske) and 5 villages:
 Zalissia
 Uhryn
 Shvaikivtsi
 Shmankivtsi
 Shmankivchyky

References 

Hromadas of Ternopil Oblast
Zavodske settlement hromada